John Ballance (27 March 1839 – 27 April 1893) was an Irish-born New Zealand politician who was the 14th premier of New Zealand, from January 1891 to April 1893, the founder of the Liberal Party (the country's first organised political party), and a Georgist. In 1890 he led his party to its first election victory, forming the first New Zealand government along party lines, but died in office three years later. Ballance supported votes for women. He also supported land reform, though at considerable cost to Māori.

Early life

The eldest son of Samuel Ballance, a tenant farmer, and Mary McNiece, Ballance was born on 27 March 1839 in Glenavy in County Antrim in Ireland. He was educated at a national school, then apprenticed to an ironmonger in Belfast. He later became a clerk in a wholesale ironmonger's house in Birmingham, where he married. Ballance was highly interested in literature, and was known for spending vast amounts of time reading books. He also became interested in politics, mostly due to the influence of his parents – his father was active in conservative circles, while his mother was a liberal. It was from his mother that Ballance gained many of the ideas he was later to promote. Having witnessed religious rioting when in Belfast, he became committed to the principle of secularism.

In 1866, Ballance and his wife migrated to New Zealand, intending to start in business as a small jeweller. After settling in Wanganui, however, he took an opportunity to found a newspaper, The Wanganui Herald. He became the editor, and remained chief owner for the rest of his life. During the fighting with the Māori chief Titokowaru in 1867, Ballance was involved in the raising of a volunteer cavalry troop, in which he received a commission. He was later deprived of this owing to the appearance in the Herald of articles criticising the management of the campaign. He behaved well in the field, and, in spite of his dismissal, was awarded the New Zealand Medal.

Following the conflict, Ballance's status in Wanganui grew. He was respected for his management of the Herald, particularly his forthright and direct approach to reporting. He became increasingly involved in the affairs of the town, establishing a number of societies and associations. Perhaps the least important to Wanganui but among the most important to him was the chess club – he became a skilled player. In 1868 his wife Fanny died of illness, aged only 24. Two years later, he married Ellen Anderson, daughter of a Wellington architect.

Member of Parliament

Ballance first contemplated moving into national politics in 1872, putting his name forward as a candidate for the seat of Egmont in a parliamentary by-election. However, Ballance withdrew from the ballot before the vote was held. In 1875, Ballance entered Parliament, having won Rangitikei in a by-election. He campaigned on two major issues – the abolition of the provinces (widely regarded as incompetent, petty, and obstructive) and the provision of free education. Ballance soon made his presence felt in Wellington. The abolition of the provinces occurred in 1876 under Julius Vogel—after which Ballance turned his attention to promoting closer land settlement, considering it the main political issue of the day.

Grey Ministry
In 1877, Ballance entered the cabinet of Sir George Grey, a former Governor who was then Premier. Grey's policies were not closely aligned with those of Ballance, but Ballance believed that he could nevertheless accomplish something worthwhile. He was Minister of Customs, Minister of Education, and later Colonial Treasurer. His appointment to head the treasury was a surprise to most, giving a high office to a relative newcomer on the political stage.

On 6 August 1878, Ballance delivered a financial statement, which was seen as the most significant since the public works announcement by Julius Vogel in 1870. Ballance set about reforming the tariff system by removing duties on basic necessities and introducing a modest though somewhat symbolic land tax, an idea he later revisited. His alliance with Grey ended with a notorious and very painful quarrel. Ballance found Grey far too controlling and authoritarian, resigning his portfolios yet still gave him confidence in the house.

From 1879 Ballance represented Wanganui, but in 1881 he lost by just four votes (393 to 397), and it was reported that seven of his supporters were too late to vote as their carriage broke down. He returned to Parliament for Wanganui in 1884.

Stout Ministry

On re-election as an Independent in 1884, Ballance became a minister in the Cabinet of Robert Stout, a fellow liberal. He was Minister of Lands and Immigration, Minister of Defence and Minister of Native Affairs (relations with Māori). In his role as Minister of Lands he encouraged intensive settlement of rural areas, aiming to increase the number of people leaving the cities to "work the land", which he believed was essential to increase productivity and self-sufficiency. His system of state-aided "village settlements" – small holdings were leased by the Crown to farmers and money lent them to make a beginning of building and cultivation – was generally successful.

Despite this desire for increased settlement of colonist-held land, he strongly supported the rights of Māori to retain the land they still held – many other politicians of his time believed that acquisition of Māori land was essential for increasing settlement. He reduced military presence in areas where strong tensions with Māori existed, and made an attempt to familiarise himself with Māori language and culture. In 1887 Stout's government lost the general election, but Ballance remained popular. Illness initially prevented his full participation in politics, but with his recovery in July 1889 he became Leader of the Opposition.

Premier

In 1890 Ballance led a loose coalition of liberal politicians to victory in the general election. The more liberal minded candidates at the election fared well as there was public discontent with the sitting administration. The background of the election was filled with strikes and an economic recession. Harry Atkinson, the Premier who had defeated Stout, was forced to resign, but not before stacking the Legislative Council with his supporters. This was a serious problem for Ballance's premiership but he was able to overcome it, partly by reducing the life-tenure of legislative councillors to one term of seven years.  His successful battle with the Governor over changes to the Legislative Council helped define the relationship between the elected Premier and the appointed Governor, mostly in the Premier's favour.

Ballance was actively involved in the advocacy of women's suffrage, declaring to Parliament that he believed in the "absolute equality of the sexes." This was a cause he had partially inherited from his colleague in the Stout government, Julius Vogel, and in which he was influenced by his politically astute wife. Ballance was also responsible for the establishment, in 1891, of the progressive land tax and progressive income tax. He was widely praised for his handling of the economy, which expanded greatly during his term.

First Liberal Government

As leader of Parliament's liberal faction, he brought his allies and colleagues into the Liberal Party, New Zealand's first political party, intended to embody the liberal ideas of Stout, Vogel, and Ballance himself. The next four premiers were from the party, although some (such as Richard Seddon) did not live up to the ideals that Ballance tried to establish. Quiet and unassuming in manner and well read, Ballance always seemed fonder of his books and his chessboard than of public bustle. He has been described as "unassuming and unpretentious", and was quiet, polite, and extremely patient.

After handpicking a cabinet of men of considerable talent, Ballance led the government through two difficult years of economic reform. He appointed himself as Treasurer, and in this capacity he implemented new land and income taxes, similar to that of the taxes introduced under Grey, though more radical. Several other notable pieces of legislation were passed by Ballance in this period, such as the Land Act 1892 and the Land for Settlements Act 1892. Despite initial outcry, the tax was seen as equitable by the people, who eventually found themselves better off as a result of such a great decrease in direct taxations.

Death

In 1893, at the height of his success and popularity, he died in Wellington of an intestinal disease after a major surgical operation. He is believed to have supported Stout as his successor, but the rapid onset of his illness prevented him from securing that outcome and he was followed by Seddon. He was the first New Zealand Prime Minister to die in office.

A statue was erected to his memory in front of Parliament House, Wellington, in front of what is now the parliamentary library – Parliament has since moved to a bigger, adjacent building. A statue was erected in Moutoa Gardens in Wanganui.

Notes

References

Further reading

|-

|-

|-

|-

1839 births
1893 deaths
New Zealand people of Irish descent
New Zealand defence ministers
New Zealand education ministers
New Zealand finance ministers
New Zealand journalists
New Zealand Liberal Party MPs
Leaders of political parties in New Zealand
People from County Antrim
Prime Ministers of New Zealand
New Zealand people of Ulster-Scottish descent
Leaders of the Opposition (New Zealand)
New Zealand MPs for North Island electorates
Members of the New Zealand House of Representatives
Unsuccessful candidates in the 1881 New Zealand general election
19th-century New Zealand journalists
Male journalists
19th-century male writers
19th-century New Zealand politicians
Secularism in New Zealand
Northern Ireland emigrants to New Zealand
Georgist politicians